The 1946–47 season was the 47th season in the history of Berner Sport Club Young Boys. The team played their home games at Stadion Wankdorf in Bern.

Players
 Ernst Brechbühl
 Achille Siegrist
 Louis Gobet
 Albert Stoll
 Ernst Giacometti
 Walter Grütter
 Robert Weil
 Eugène Walaschek
 Hans Grütter
 Hans Blaser
 Charles Casali

Competitions

Overall record

Nationalliga A

League table

Matches

Swiss Cup

References

BSC Young Boys seasons
Swiss football clubs 1946–47 season